The Union of Cypriots is a progressive and Cypriot nationalist political organization in Cyprus. The Union of Cypriots campaigns for a unitary Cypriot state, the restoration of the constitutional order that was destroyed in Cyprus after the crisis of 1963-64, and the ending of the Turkish occupation of Cyprus.

History and overview
The Union of Cypriots' origins root back to different organisations including the World Union of Turkish-speaking Cypriots, and the youth organisation LINOBAMBAKI, which was one of the formations that led the 2011 Turkish Cypriot protests.  The organization supports a unitary solution instead of a federal one, concerning the reunification of Cyprus. With the idea of Cyprus belonging to all Cypriots, Greek Cypriots and Turkish Cypriots, the organisation supports turning back to 1960 constitution, and reinforcing it more in the line of "one nation, one flag, one homeland and one state" view. The organization campaigns  against Turkey's illegal settlement policy in Cyprus.

The organization supported Cypriots who were targeted in the occupied areas of Cyprus, in events such as the prosecution of some community members for hanging the flag of the Republic of Cyprus in 2013, the attacks against the Afrika newspaper by Turkish settlers in 2018, the court cases that were filed against journalists by Turkey in 2019, and the actions against the workers who wanted to cross barricades to enter the free areas in 2020. Because of its activities, the leadership of the organization was blacklisted and declared persona non grata by Turkey in 2021.

In 2019, the Union of Cypriots announced to public its interest in participating in the European Parliament elections independently, but later it was represented by Oz Karahan on the ticket of Jasmine Movement.

The Union of Cypriots is a member of international organisations such as the International League of Peoples' Struggle, the International Coordination of Revolutionary Parties and Organizations, the Global Ecosocialist Network, and the No to War - No to NATO.

Honorary Awards
The Union of Cypriots presents Honorary Awards in memory of Dr. İhsan Ali, a Cypriot community leader and a statesman.

References

External links

Cypriot nationalism
Political organisations based in Cyprus
Organisations based in Northern Cyprus
Cyprus dispute
Anti-imperialist organizations
National liberation movements
International League of Peoples' Struggle
International Coordination of Revolutionary Parties and Organizations